were the feudal noble warrior class of Ethiopia. Originally recruited and appointed for the Emperor army service, they formed a class of professional soldiers, also known for traditional warriorhood practices and a rich cultural background. They were allocated with land grants for their sustainment. Their installation in settlements were instrumental in creating the nucleus of urban centers as well as the land tenure system through Ethiopia and Eritrea. By the early 20th century, scholars could identify 66 villages in Eritrea with a Chewa settlement origin.

Terminology
In medieval Ethiopia, from the reign of Amde Tseyon, Chewa regiments, or legions, formed the backbone of the Empire's military forces. The Ge’ez term for these regiments is ṣewa (ጼዋ) while the Amharic term is č̣äwa (ጨዋ). Earlier Axumite sources refer to sarawit (sing sarwe) as the name for the regiments, each sarawit being headed by a negus (nägästa säräwit). In late sources, from Zemene Mesafint onwards, regional levies under a noble are referred to as wa'alyan of nobles.

History

Medieval period
Although the origins of several Chewa Regiments (such as Jan Amora) predate the establishment of Yekuno Amlak dynasty, their real development occurred mostly under the latter, as well as Baeda Maryam I and Zara Yaqob. The normal size of a regiment was several thousand soldiers. Each regiment was allocated a fief (Gult) to ensure its upkeep ensured by the land revenue. In 1445, following the Battle of Gomit, the chronicles record that Emperor Zara Yacoq started garrisoning the provinces with Chewa regiments.

Major divisions of the military were:
 Regiments at the court, under high court officials
 Regiments in the provinces, under regional Rases or other officials
 Regiments in border regions, or more autonomous provinces, such as Hadiya, Bahir Negash, Bale, under azmač who were military officials appointed by the king.

Early Modern period

Modern period

One of the Chewa regiments, known as the Abe Lahm in Geez, or the Weregenu, in Oromo, lasted, and participated to the Battle of Adwa, only to be phased out in the 1920s.

The modern army was created under Ras Tafari Makonnen, in 1917, with the formation of the Kebur Zabagna, the imperial guard.

Philosophy

Arts and Zeraf poetry

The Zeraf were narrations of accomplishment of a warrior success. Generally given during the course of military banquets, they constituted by both of a self declaration loyalty to ones masters, and ones accomplishments.

Weapons & Education 

The classic weapons of antiquity and medieval Ethiopia where the curved sword (shotel), the spear (tor). Distance weaponry such as bows and javelins (armah) were practised. Armour, such as coat of mails, was also well known.

Firearms became more widespread under the reign of Dawit II. Matchlocks, light artillery, being introduced at this period. The Chewa acquired proficiency in weapon use from their young age: being trained from their childhood with games such as Akandura (Darts) and Gena (ገና, Field hockey) which figurated combats.

Hunting (Aden) traditions played an important role in the upbringing of a Chewa warrior. The killings of wild beasts were rewarded by the patron, or Mekwuanint, to whom the Chewa belonged to. An elephant killer would for example hence wear a silver chain around his neck, a gold earring in his right ear. A rhinoceros killer would be awarded a cross earring, and a gold chain with silk threads for his neck. Along with these jewellery gifts, prizes of weaponry were also frequent.

References

Bibliography 
 Merid W. Aregay, Military Elites in Medieval Ethiopia, Journal of Ethiopian Studies Vol. 30, No. 1 (June 1997), pp. 31–73, https://www.jstor.org/stable/41966063?seq=1
 Ishikawa Hiroki, Changes in the Military System during the Gondar Period (1632-1769): Their Influence on the Decline of the Solomonic Dynasty, Annales d'Éthiopie Vol. 18, (2002) pp. 215–229, https://www.persee.fr/doc/ethio_0066-2127_2002_num_18_1_1022
 Tewolde Berhan Gebre Egziabeher, Firearms in rural and traditional Ethiopia and human rights, United Nations University Press, 1993, http://archive.unu.edu/unupress/unupbooks/uu08ie/uu08ie0m.htm#background%20information

Combat occupations
Noble titles
Ethiopian military personnel